Robert Lord (by 1495 – 1531 or later), of Great Grimsby, Lincolnshire, was an English politician.

He was a Member (MP) of the Parliament of England for Great Grimsby in 1523.

References

15th-century births
16th-century deaths
Members of the Parliament of England for Great Grimsby
English MPs 1523